Rodia is a village and a community of the Tyrnavos municipality. Before the 2011 local government reform it was a part of the municipality of Ampelonas.  The 2011 census recorded 732 inhabitants in the community. The community of Rodia covers an area of 66.886 km2.

Population
According to the 2011 census, the population of the community of Rodia was 732 people, a decrease of almost 23% compared with the population of the previous census of 2001.

See also
 List of settlements in the Larissa regional unit

References

Populated places in Larissa (regional unit)
Tyrnavos